De Mandeville is the surname of an old Norman noble family originating from Normandy. The first records are about Geoffrey de Mandeville, Norman conqueror. The de Mandeville family held lands in England and France.

French origin
The family descend from Geoffrey de Mandeville.

England
Geoffrey de Mandeville was a companion of William the Conqueror in 1066. Geoffrey obtained lands in Wiltshire, Essex and others and was appointed the Constable of the Tower of London.

The sons of Geoffrey Fitz Peter and Beatrice de Say adopted the surname of de Mandeville in the right of their mother as co-heiress of her grandfather Geoffrey de Mandeville, Earl of Essex, after that line ended.

Citations

References

Medieval English families
Anglo-Norman families
De Mandeville family